The 1888 United States presidential election in Kansas took place on November 6, 1888, as part of the 1888 United States presidential election. Voters chose nine representatives, or electors to the Electoral College, who voted for president and vice president.

Kansas voted for the Republican nominee, Benjamin Harrison, over the Democratic nominee, incumbent President Grover Cleveland. Harrison won the state by a margin of 24.20%.

With 55.23% of the popular vote, Kansas would prove to be Harrison's fourth strongest victory in terms of percentage in the popular vote after Vermont, Nevada and Maine.

Results

Results by county

See also
 United States presidential elections in Kansas

Notes

References

Kansas
1888
1888 Kansas elections